Abstract State Machine Language (AsmL) is a programming language based on abstract state machines developed by Microsoft. AsmL is a functional language.

XASM is an open source implementation of the language.

References

External links
Microsoft: ASML
XASM

.NET programming languages